Two ships of the United States Navy have borne the name USS La Vallette, named in honor of Rear Admiral Elie A. F. La Vallette.

United States Navy ship names